44 Scotland Street is an episodic novel by Alexander McCall Smith, the author of The No. 1 Ladies' Detective Agency.  The story was first published as a serial in The Scotsman, starting 26 January 2004, every weekday, for six months.  The book retains the 100+ short chapters of the original.  It was partially influenced by Armistead Maupin's Tales of the City, a famous serial story. It is the first book in a series of the same name. The series now has 15 books, as of 2021.

Plot introduction
The novel tells the story of Pat, a student during her second gap year and a source of some worry to her parents, who is accepted as a new tenant at 44 Scotland Street (a real street) in Edinburgh's very wealthy New Town, and her various roommates and neighbours. She falls in love with her narcissistic flatmate Bruce, meets the intriguing and opinionated anthropologist Domenica Macdonald and her friend Angus, and works at an art gallery for Matthew, who was given the gallery as a sinecure position by his wealthy father.

While working at the gallery Pat points out to Matthew (who knows almost nothing about art) that one of their paintings looks as if it could be a work of Samuel Peploe. After the gallery is broken into Matthew asks Pat to store the painting at their flat until they can check whether it's a genuine Peploe, but Bruce gives the painting to a raffle run by the South Edinburgh Conservative Association. Matthew and Pat eventually track it down to the (real-life) novelist Ian Rankin who gives it back to them.

The other major storyline is that of five-year-old Bertie, who is controlled by his pretentious and intellectual mother Irene - he has Grade Six on the saxophone, speaks fluent Italian, and is extremely knowledgeable about various subjects. After he is expelled from his nursery school, Irene sends him to psychotherapy with Dr Fairbairn, who constantly misinterprets Bertie's simple wish to be a normal five-year-old boy.

44 Scotland Street series
See also: Bertie Pollock
2005: 44 Scotland Street
2005: Espresso Tales
2006: Love Over Scotland
2007: The World According to Bertie
2008: The Unbearable Lightness of Scones
2010: The Importance of Being Seven
2011: Bertie Plays The Blues
2012: Sunshine on Scotland Street
2013: Bertie's Guide to Life and Mothers
2015: The Revolving Door of Life
2016: The Bertie Project 
2017: A Time of Love and Tartan
2019: The Peppermint Tea Chronicles
2020: A Promise of Ankles
2022: Love in the Time of Bertie

Characters

Major recurring characters
Pat MacGregor is twenty (see above)
Matthew Duncan, owner of an art gallery and Pat's boss
Bertie Pollock, 5-year-old saxophone player who can also speak Italian, son of the dreadful Irene
Irene Pollock, Bertie's mother, busybody and disciple of Melanie Klein
Domenica MacDonald, their neighbour
Bruce Anderson, Pat's narcissistic flatmate
Angus Lordie, portrait painter and owner of Cyril
Big Lou, owner of coffee bar
Stuart Pollock, Bertie's statistician father
Elspeth Harmony, Bertie's teacher

Minor characters
Cyril, Angus's dog with the gold tooth
Dr. Hugo Fairbairn, Bertie's psychoanalyst, famous for his study of Wee Fraser
Ian Rankin, Scottish novelist of Rebus fame
Aloysius (Lard) O'Connor, Glasgow "business man" with the physique of a Munro
Ramsey Dunbarton, retired lawyer whose main claim to fame is his erstwhile performance as the Duke of Plaza-Toro in The Gondoliers
Duke of Johannesburg, a dubious Duke who likes to philosophize

Literary significance and reception

Publishers Weekly said that 44 Scotland Street was "episodic, amusing and peopled with characters both endearing and benignly problematic."  Library Journal said that "Smith's insightful and comic observations, makes for an amusing and absorbing look at Edinburgh's high society." Bookseller said that "the writing style is understated, and the humour subtle but at times devastating."

A stage adaptation, entitled The World According to Bertie, was performed at the 2011 Edinburgh Festival Fringe.

Television series
In 2019 it was announced that the novels would become a television series. It had already been a series on BBC Radio 4.

References

External links
 Official Alexander McCall Smith website

2005 British novels
Novels by Alexander McCall Smith
Novels first published in serial form
Novels set in Edinburgh
Works originally published in The Scotsman
Polygon Books books